Gervasio Gatti (c. 1550 in either Cremona, Vercelli or Pavia – c. 1631) was  an Italian painter during the late-Renaissance, active in Parma, Piacenza, and Cremona.  He was also known as Il Soiaro (or Sojaro) Gatti trained with his uncle Bernardino Gatti. He helped decorate the salons in the Rocca of San Secondo Parmense.  He also studied with Correggio.

Works
Portrait of Margherita Aldobrandini
Portrait of Alexander Farnese (uncertain) 
Transfiguration of Christ, San Francesco church, Pavia
Martyr of Saint Catherine, Santa Maria Assunta and San Cristoforo in Castello churches in Viadana
Martyr of Saint Stephen, Sant'Agata church, Cremona
Saint Sebastian (San Sebastiano) (1578), Sant'Agata church, Cremona
Martyr of Saint Cecilia (1601), San Pietro church, Cremona

References

Luigi Lanzi, History of Paintings in Italy since the Renaissance
Marco Horak, Nella chiesa di San Bartolomeo a Ottavello due grandi opere di Gervasio Gatti il Sojaro, Piacenza, 2020.
 Marco Horak, Gervasio Gatti detto il Sojaro tra Cremona, Parma e Piacenza, in "Panorama Musei" Anno XXV, N. 2, agosto 2020.

External links

1550s births
1630s deaths
16th-century Italian painters
Italian male painters
17th-century Italian painters
Italian Renaissance painters
Painters from Parma